Professor Ajith Kumar Siriwardena MBChB, M.D., FRCS, Is the current professor of hepato-pancreatico-biliary surgery at the University of Manchester, and a consultant hepatobiliary surgeon at the Manchester Royal Infirmary.

Biography
Qualified in medicine from the University of Manchester and trained in surgery in Manchester and Edinburgh. Undertook advanced liver surgical training in Paris and worked as a consultant in the national liver surgery unit in Scotland. Currently provides expertise in liver surgery and pancreas surgery, especially for patients who have had bowel cancer and have then developed metastases in the liver.

Research
Professor Siriwardena's main research interests are liver metastases from bowel cancer.
His work has been published in over 100 peer reviewed articles.
He sits on the council of the Society of Academic Research (SARS) as well as on the committee of Europe and Africa Hepato-pancreato-Biliary Association (EAHPBA).

References

Living people
Alumni of the University of Manchester
Place of birth missing (living people)
Academics of the University of Manchester
British surgeons
Surgeons
Surgeons, Fellows of the Royal College of
Physicians of the Manchester Royal Infirmary
British people of Sri Lankan descent
Sinhalese physicians
1956 births